Urs Kolly (born 24 July 1968 in Fribourg) is a Swiss retired Paralympic athlete who has won seven Paralympic gold medals and a bronze medal and multiple World medals. He has won one or more golds at every Summer Paralympics from 1992 to 2004. He also won a bronze at the 2008 Summer Paralympics. In addition to this he won the 2004 Credit Suisse Sports Awards for disabled athlete.

References

External links
 

1968 births
Living people
People from Fribourg
Paralympic athletes of Switzerland
Swiss male discus throwers
Swiss male long jumpers
Swiss male javelin throwers
Swiss male shot putters
Swiss pentathletes
Athletes (track and field) at the 1992 Summer Paralympics
Athletes (track and field) at the 1996 Summer Paralympics
Athletes (track and field) at the 2000 Summer Paralympics
Athletes (track and field) at the 2004 Summer Paralympics
Athletes (track and field) at the 2008 Summer Paralympics
Paralympic gold medalists for Switzerland
Paralympic bronze medalists for Switzerland
Medalists at the 1992 Summer Paralympics
Medalists at the 1996 Summer Paralympics
Medalists at the 2000 Summer Paralympics
Medalists at the 2004 Summer Paralympics
Medalists at the 2008 Summer Paralympics
Paralympic medalists in athletics (track and field)
Medalists at the World Para Athletics Championships
Medalists at the World Para Athletics European Championships
Sportspeople from the canton of Fribourg
Paralympic discus throwers
Paralympic long jumpers
Paralympic javelin throwers
Paralympic shot putters
Discus throwers with limb difference
Long jumpers with limb difference
Javelin throwers with limb difference
Shot putters with limb difference